Ab Nai (also Romanized as Āb Nā’ī) is a village in Kiskan Rural District, in the Central District of Baft County, Kerman Province, Iran. At the 2006 census, its population was 31, in 7 families.

References 

Populated places in Baft County